The 2016 Home Hardware Canada Cup of Curling was held from November 30 to December 4 at Westman Communications Group Place in Brandon, Manitoba. 

Reid Carruthers and his rink from Manitoba won the men's tournament, qualifying his team for the 2017 Canadian Olympic Curling Trials. Jennifer Jones, also from Manitoba and her team won the women's event, but had already previously qualified for the Olympic Trials.

Men

Teams
The teams are listed as follows:

Round-robin standings
Final round-robin standings

Round-robin results
All times are listed in Central Daylight Time (UTC−05:00).

Draw 1
Wednesday, November 30, 8:30 am

Draw 2
Wednesday, November 30, 1:30 pm

Draw 3
Wednesday, November 30, 6:30 pm

Draw 4
Thursday, December 1, 8:30 am

Draw 5
Thursday, December 1, 1:30 pm

Draw 6
Thursday, December 1, 6:30 pm

Draw 7
Friday, December 2, 8:30 am

Draw 8
Friday, December 2, 1:30 pm

Draw 9
Friday, December 2, 6:30 pm

Tiebreakers
Saturday, December 3, 8:30 am

Saturday, December 3, 1:30 pm

Playoffs

Semifinal
Saturday, December 3, 6:30 pm

Final
Sunday, December 4, 6:30 pm

Player percentages
After Round Robin Play

Women

Teams
The teams are listed as follows:

Round-robin standings
Final round-robin standings

Round-robin results
All times are listed in Central Daylight Time (UTC−05:00).

Draw 1
Wednesday, November 30, 8:30 am

Draw 2
Wednesday, November 30, 1:30 pm

Draw 3
Wednesday, November 30, 6:30 pm

Draw 4
Thursday, December 1, 8:30 am

Draw 5
Thursday, December 1, 1:30 pm

Draw 6
Thursday, December 1, 6:30 pm

Draw 7
Friday, December 2, 8:30 am

Draw 8
Friday, December 2, 1:30 pm

Draw 9
Friday, December 2, 6:30 pm

Tiebreaker
Saturday, December 3, 8:30 am

Playoffs

Semifinal
Saturday, December 3, 1:30 pm

Final
Sunday, December 4, 1:30 pm

Player percentages
After Round Robin Play

References

External links

Canada Cup (curling)
Canada Cup
Canada Cup
Curling competitions in Brandon, Manitoba
Curling
Curling